The Red and the Blue is a 2012 Italian drama film written and directed by Giuseppe Piccioni. For his performance Roberto Herlitzka was nominated for David di Donatello for best actor.  The film also received two nominations at Nastri d'Argento Awards, for best screenplay and for best production.

Cast 
Margherita Buy as Headmaster Giuliana
Riccardo Scamarcio as  Professor Giovanni Prezioso
Roberto Herlitzka as Professor Fiorito
 Silvia D'Amico as  Angela Mordini
 Davide Giordano as  Enrico Brugnoli
 Nina Torresi as  Melania
 Ionut Paun as  Adam
 Lucia Mascino as  Elena Togani
 Domiziana Cardinali as  Silvana Petrucci
Gene Gnocchi as Giuliana's lover
 Elena Lietti as Emma Tassi

References

External links

Italian drama films
2012 drama films
2012 films
Films directed by Giuseppe Piccioni
Italian high school films
2010s Italian films